The Georgetown Hoyas women's lacrosse team competes in the Big East Conference, an NCAA Division I conference.  The first team was formed in 1977.

Historical statistics
*Statistics through 2018 season

Current team
The current head coach is Ricky Fried, who took over after Kim Simons retired following the 2004 season.  Previously, Fried held the positions of assistant coach from 2002–2003 and associate head coach from 2003–2004, both under Simons.

The current assistant coaches are Erin Wellner-Hellmold and Michi Ellers.  Hellmold played for Fried at Johns Hopkins University.  Ellers played under Simons, with Fried as assistant coach, at Georgetown from 2002-2004.

History
The Georgetown Women's Lacrosse team advanced to two National Championship games in 2001 and 2002.  The team appeared in 9 consecutive NCAA tournaments from 1998–2006 and advanced to 3 NCAA Final Four games in 2001, 2002, and 2004.  The team had an undefeated record in the Big East from 2001–2006, earning them 6 consecutive Conference Championships.  In 2007, the women's lacrosse team was defeated by Syracuse University in the first ever Big East women's lacrosse tournament.  However, the Hoyas had previously been crowned the Big East Regular-Season Champions.

2006 season
In 2006, the Georgetown Women's lacrosse team continued to be a household name on the national scene.  The team started the 2006 season ranked number 10/12 in National Polls and climbed all the way to earn the number 3 seed in their ninth straight NCAA Tournament appearance.  Key regular season wins over Princeton, North Carolina, Maryland and Notre Dame continued to give the Hoyas a strong reputation as the women's game grows across the country.  The Hoyas posted a 14-4 overall record, won its sixth straight Big East Conference Championship and made its eighth consecutive appearance in the NCAA Tournament Quarterfinals.  The Hoyas defense ranked second in the nation allowing just 7.0 goals per game.  During the 2006 season, the team posted a 4-1 record in a program-high five overtime games.  Additionally, the squad had a 5-2 record in games decided by one goal.

New to the coaching staff in 2006, was assistant coach Michi Ellers, a former Georgetown player from 2000-2004.  The team was led by Captains Stephanie Zodtner and Coco Stanwick.

2005 season
After advancing to the second round of the NCAA Tournament after beating Towson University 15-14, the Hoyas fell to Dartmouth College by a score of 13-3.  The game marked Georgetown's seventh consecutive appearance in the NCAA quarterfinals and the team's eighth-straight NCAA appearance.  Georgetown finished the 2005 season with a 13-5 overall record and a perfect 5-0 mark in the Big East.  The team earned its fifth consecutive Big East Championship, continuing its undefeated record in the conference.  This was Ricky Fried's first year as head coach of the team and   Bowen Holden's first year as associate head coach.  This was Erin Wellner's first year as assistant coach.  The team was led by Captains Lauryn Bernier, Allison Chambers and Sarah Oliphant.

2004 season
The Hoyas continued to be undefeated Big East with a spotless 6-0 conference record in 2004. As Big East Conference Champion, the team earned an automatic bid to the NCAA tournament.  The Hoyas advanced to the semifinals before losing to Virginia 12-9. The team was led by head coach, Kim Simons, associate head coach, Ricky Fried, assistant coach, Bowen Holden, and Captains Anouk Peters, Michi Ellers, and Gloria Lozano.

Individual career records

Reference:

Individual single-season records

Seasons

Postseason Results

The Hoyas have appeared in 15 NCAA tournaments. Their postseason record is 14-15.

See also
 Georgetown Hoyas men's lacrosse

References

External links
 

 
College women's lacrosse teams in the United States
Big East Conference women's lacrosse
1975 establishments in Washington, D.C.
Lacrosse clubs established in 1975
Lacrosse teams in Washington, D.C.
Women in Washington, D.C.